Judith Paige Mitchell (November 24, 1932 – February 10, 2010) was a television writer, executive producer and novelist.

Biography
Judith Paige Segel was a native of New Orleans. Her parents were George Jacob Segel (1906-1993) and Esther (née Finerosky) (1908-1995). She started her career as a novelist, her subjects including integration and civil rights.  She moved to Los Angeles in 1965 after divorcing her first husband Alvin Binder, a noted civil rights attorney in Jackson, MS, and also worked in television as a writer and producer, with many topics focused on true crime.  Mitchell died of cancer in Los Angeles on February 10, 2010, survived by her husband and well-known Los Angeles publisher Jeremy Tarcher and three children.

Literary credits
 A Wilderness of Monkeys (1965)
 Love is Not a Safe Country (1968)
 The Mayfly (1971)
 The Covenant, a Novel (1973)
 Act of Love (1976) (adapted into 1980 television movie of the same name)
 Wild Seed (1982)

Teleplay credits
Desperate for Love (1989)
Lies of the Heart: The Story of Laurie Kellogg (1994)
Young at Heart (1995 TV movie) (1995)
Glory, Glory (1998)

References

External links

1932 births
2010 deaths
Writers from New Orleans
20th-century American novelists
American women novelists
American television writers
Deaths from cancer in California
20th-century American women writers
Novelists from Louisiana
Screenwriters from California
Screenwriters from Louisiana
American women television writers
21st-century American women